Bole Alashankou Airport  is an airport serving the cities of Bole and Alashankou in Bortala Mongol Autonomous Prefecture and Shuanghe in Xinjiang Uygur Autonomous Region, China.  It is located 18 kilometers east of Bole, 50 kilometers south of the Alashankou border crossing with Kazakhstan, and 10 kilometers north of Shuanghe. Construction started in July 2009 with an investment of 320 million yuan, and the airport was opened on 10 July 2010.

Airlines and destinations

See also
List of airports in China
List of the busiest airports in China

References

Airports in Xinjiang
Airports established in 2010
2010 establishments in China